is a Japanese mini-series of nine CGI short films and OVAs based on the Gundam anime franchise, released from 2004 to 2009 in three chapters each comprising three episodes.  Directed by Takashi Imanishi (who previously directed Gundam 0083) and with Yutaka Izubuchi as production supervisor, the series' storyline takes place during the One Year War of the original Universal Century timeline.

Overview

Mobile Suit Gundam MS IGLOO
Taking place at roughly the same time as the original Mobile Suit Gundam, MS IGLOO follows the exploits of the Principality of Zeon's 603rd Technical Evaluation Unit, a special crew of weapons development researchers. Stationed aboard the former civilian cargo ship Jotunheim (named after the land of the giants in Norse mythology), the unit field-tests various prototype weapons for combat use under the supervision of Engineer Lieutenant Oliver May. IGLOO's six episodes chronicle the 603rd's adventures as pivotal episodes throughout the One-Year War that were barely mentioned in-depth in the original series.

Mobile Suit Gundam MS IGLOO 2: Gravity Front
 was announced on March 25, 2008.  The series consist of three 30-minute episodes and is set on Earth and from Earth Federation's point of view.  The 3D CGI is in high definition, higher in quality than what was seen in the previous productions.  The production staff is largely unchanged, though the mecha designers behind the design works in this series are Yutaka Izubuchi, Kimitoshi Yamane, Takuhito Kusanagi, Shinji Aramaki and Fumihiro Katagai. The super high-detail designs appeared in the U.C. Hardgraph line were used as is in the animation.

The 1st episode "Shoot at that Death!" was released on October 24, 2008.  The 2nd episode "King of the Land, Forward!" was released on January 23, 2009.  The 3rd episode "Odessa, Iron Storm!" was released on April 24, 2009.

Theme music
 by Taja

 by Taja

Mr. Lonely Heart by Haruna Yokota
Theme song to 

Places in the Heart by Shinji Kakijima
Theme song to 

No Limit∞ by Taja
Theme song to

Cast

The Hidden One Year War & Apocalypse 0079
Oliver May — Hideo Ishikawa
Monique Cadillac — Miki Nagasawa
Martin Prochnow — Shōzō Iizuka
Albert Schacht — Tamio Ōki
Domenico Marquez — Katsuya Shiga
Erich Kruger — Hiroshi Matsumoto
Hideo Washiya — Jun Fukuyama
Jean Xavier — Mikako Takahashi
Aleksandro Hemme — Katsuhisa Hōki
Demeziere Sonnen — Masuo Amada
Jean Luc Duvall — Takaya Hashi
Werner Holbein — Ken'yū Horiuchi
Erwin Cadillac - Sayaka Aida
Herbert von Kuspen - Ikuya Sawaki
Gihren Zabi — Banjō Ginga
Federico Czariano — Jōji Nakata

Gravity Front
Ben Barberry — Masaki Terasoma
Papa Sidney Lewis — Nobuyuki Hiyama
Michael Colmatta — Hiroki Tōchi
Harman Yandell — Tsutomu Isobe
Rayban Surat — Katsuyuki Konishi
Arleen Nazon — Kikuko Inoue
Clyde Bettany — Kōji Yusa
Milos Karppi — Taiten Kusunoki
Doroba Kuzwayo — Kentarō Itō
Death deity — Kikuko Inoue
Kycilia Zabi — Mami Koyama
Elmer Snell — Akio Ōtsuka

Episodes

The Hidden One Year War

Apocalypse 0079

Gravity Front

Reception
Carl Kimlinger of Anime News Network gave the series a C praising the plot and CG graphics.

References

External links
MS IGLOO — Official Site (Japanese)
MS IGLOO 2 — Official Site (Japanese)

2004 anime OVAs
2006 anime OVAs
2008 anime OVAs
Bandai Entertainment anime titles
Igloo
Sunrise (company)